Arsin  is a coastal town and a district of Trabzon Province in the Black Sea region of Turkey. The mayor is Erdem Şen member of ruling (AKP) party .

References

External links
 Head official of a district - Arsin
 Municipality of Arsin
 Arsin Web Portal
 Arsin web page

Populated coastal places in Turkey
Populated places in Trabzon Province
Fishing communities in Turkey
Districts of Trabzon Province